The 2019 Telkom Knockout was the 38th edition and final edition of the Telkom Knockout, a South African cup competition comprising the 16 teams in the Premier Soccer League. It took place between October and December 2019 and was won by Mamelodi Sundowns.

Teams

Stadium and Locations

Round of 16

Quarter-finals

Semi-finals

Final

Statistics

References

Telkom Knockout
Telkom Knockout